Never Lose That Feeling is fifth EP release by English alternative rock band Swervedriver. Produced by Swervedriver and Alan Moulder, the EP was released on 18 May 1992. The EP is the band's final release with the original lineup. The title track off the EP, which was included on the US edition of the band's second album Mezcal Head (1993), was released as a single in 1992, peaking at number 62 on UK Singles Chart.

Background
After showing an interest for collaborating with the band, engineer and producer Alan Moulder met the band at Greenhouse Studios, where the EP was recorded. Following the recording, the band embarked a North American tour. Drummer Graham Bonnar left the band while touring. After the mixing and the release of the EP, the band continued with the second leg of touring, which ended up with bassist Adi Vines departing the band.

Guitarist Jimmy Hartridge viewed the title track's riff as "a bit of a bridge between Raise and Mezcal Head in some ways."

Critical reception

Andy Kellman of Allmusic stated that "the EP is pretty much obsolete for those who own A&M's Reel to Real promo EP."

Track listing
All songs written by Swervedriver.
 "Never Lose That Feeling/Never Learn" – 11:50
 "Scrawl and Scream" – 3:50
 "(The Watchmakers) Hands" – 3:30
 "Never Lose That Feeling" – 4:05

Personnel

Swervedriver
 Adam Franklin – vocals, guitar
 Jimmy Hartridge – guitar
 Adi Vines – bass guitar 
 Graham Bonnar – drums

Other personnel
 Patrick Arbuthnot – pedal steel guitar (2)
 Stewart Dace - saxophone (1, 4)
 Alan Moulder – mixing; production (1-2, 4); engineering (1-2, 4)
 Philip Ames – engineering (3)
 Swervedriver – production (3)

Chart performances
Single

References

External links
 

1992 EPs
Swervedriver EPs
Albums produced by Alan Moulder
Creation Records EPs
1992 singles
Creation Records singles
Song recordings produced by Alan Moulder
1992 songs